Mamerz may refer to:
 Mamerz Kan
 Mamerz Si